Amoda Widanapathirana (born 5 October 2000) is a Sri Lankan cricketer. He made his List A debut on 23 December 2019, for Sri Lanka Ports Authority Cricket Club in the 2019–20 Invitation Limited Over Tournament. He made his Twenty20 debut on 4 January 2020, for Sri Lanka Ports Authority Cricket Club in the 2019–20 SLC Twenty20 Tournament.

References

External links
 

2000 births
Living people
Sri Lankan cricketers
Sri Lanka Ports Authority Cricket Club cricketers
Place of birth missing (living people)